In martial arts and tricking, the 540 kick (Chinese:旋風腳 (Xuanfengjiao)) (also known as inside turning kick, jump inside kick, and "hyper" tornado kick) is a jump kick move.   It involves a rotation of approximately 540 degrees (although when performed correctly the performer has only done a spin of 360 degrees – not including whatever takeoff used).

It is practiced in various disciplines including Taekwondo, Tang Soo Do, Wushu, Shaolin Quan, Capoeira and some Karate styles but traditionally most associated with the Korean martial arts. However, the most prominent defining feature is that the same leg is used for taking off, kicking, and landing. The other leg is used to propel the performer into the air, and is then retracted before landing. Many martial arts tricksters choose this move as their first move to attempt.

This move has a history in ballet as well, where it is performed as an advanced variation of a 'barrel roll'. Principal male ballet dancers include the move in their variation (solo) as a crowd-pleasing feat of excellence. The move and a variation of it, the reverse 540, has been present in ballet for quite some time now, and is used commonly by dancers such as Daniil Simkin, Tetsuya Kumakawa and Joseph Phillips. This move has been recently introduced into the world of professional wrestling, where it is commonly referred to as a "jumping corkscrew roundhouse kick" (and Kofi Kingston's variation is called "Trouble in Paradise").

Variations
Like most variations of martial arts kicks, the name of the kick is normally determined by the position of the foot, degree of rotation and positioning of the hips, and any additional kicks that may be added during the execution:

Fake 540
A jump turning kick that mimics the 540. The practitioner, already facing the target, jumps up to perform an inside crescent or roundhouse kick, and tucks the other to then land on the kicking foot. This motion does not share the full take off pattern of a true 540.

540 Crescent
This variation of the kick is typically found in wushu. The kick is executed as a crescent kick, meaning that the toes are pointed forwards with the hips facing the target. If aiming for a target, the target would be hit with the inside of the foot (from the heel to the big toe).

540 Roundhouse
This version rotates the hips about 90° more than a crescent before executing the kick. The kick is executed as a roundhouse kick meaning that a target would be hit with the top of the foot or ankle to avoid breaking the toes. It is also called a Bolley Kick by some in TaeKwonDo, and was popularized in the mid-eighties by George Chung and Steven Ho in open martial art competitions. In TaeKwonDo, a tricking "540" kick refers to this 540 roundhouse, rather than the TaeKwonDo 540 hook kick.

Reverse 540
The take off of this is like a 1-over 360 kick. If back on your right foot, throw it forward counterclockwise, tuck it and push off with your right. Jump up and complete 360 with an outside, counterclockwise crescent kick and land on the same foot. Look at the reverse image of a 540 and you can see it.

Lazyboy 540 (aka Playboy 540)
Also referred to as simply a Lazyboy, this version is identical to a typical 540 from a technical standpoint. The defining characteristic is that the hands are placed on the back or top of the head. This pose is to simulate the image of a person relaxing or lying down.  While struck in the air, this variation is performed to show the ease in which they can perform the trick, demonstrating that they don't need the momentum of the arms to complete the trick, and/or to add style to the trick. This trick is also known as the Playboy 540 for its extravagance and confident posture such of a playboy.

Double leg 540
This is performed with a take off from both legs and executed with an inside crescent kick.

Sideswipe
Though, the body mechanics/technique is different, the Sideswipe and 540 are categorized together because they both use the same leg to take off, kick, and land. This version is similar to a standard 540 kick, but the body is spinning parallel to the ground and can be performed almost inverted. After the non-kicking leg is thrown up in the take-off, the body is leaned back so it is spinning at least horizontally. This kick has less practical use due to the higher levels of agility required.

540 Hook (c720)
Also called a "Cheat 720" or a "540 Wheel," the 540 hook uses the same takeoff as mentioned previously. However, instead of using the jumping leg to kick, the performer spins around another 180 degrees and performs a hook kick or outside crescent kick with the other leg, depending on the position of the foot. This kick is one of the variations that actually spins a full 540°. A TaeKwonDo "540" refers to this kick.

540 Gyro
In this move, the user will execute a 540 crescent/roundhouse kick but instead of landing immediately on the kicking leg, the kicker will rotate an additional 360 degrees mid-air before landing. It is rather uncommon in the tricking community due to its difficulty, but is present in martial arts disciplines. It is most prevalent in Wushu.

540 to Splits
The traditional 540 can be landed into the splits by sending the kicking leg backwards after the kick has been executed and extending the other leg forward during the landing. Theoretically, almost every trick can be landed in the splits, however, landing some of the more advanced versions of tricks like this would require extra height in the jump, extra rotation of the body, and a very keen sense of timing and spatial awareness.

Multi-Kick Variants
Some variants of the 540 include multiple kicks being executed while in the air. Some of those variations are:

Crescent 540/Feilong
Not to be confused with the 540 crescent, a crescent 540 is where a crescent kick is thrown out with the first leg before the regular 540 kick is thrown with the other. Both of these kicks are executed mid-air. A variation of this is where the first crescent kick is thrown as a twisted front kick, followed by a round house kick. For this the hips must be rotated more before the kicks are thrown, allowing the feet to be turned towards the targets.

Jacknife
This is similar to a crescent 540 in that there are two kicks executed in sequence, however the 540 kick (either crescent or roundhouse) is thrown out first. Immediately following the first kick, the other leg comes around to execute a heel kick after rotating an additional 180 degrees. The mechanics to this variant are almost identical to a 540-wheel or cheat 720. Proper execution of this involves performing a roundhouse kick instead of an inside crescent kick, with the hips turned over and toes pointed. In doing so, after the first kick is completed, the kicker's hips and body are in a better position to spin around and snap out the hook.

540 Triple
This is the combination of a crescent 540 and a jackknife, essentially executing three separate kicks during the same motion. One with the landing leg and two with the other. The kicks and their execution are similar to those of a 720 triple. This move is commonly performed in TaeKwonDo demonstrations.

Further reading
 Fundamentals of High Performance Wushu: Taolu Jumps and Spins by Raymond Wu, . Step-by-step training book that describes how to do the kick, 360°, 540°, 720°, etc.

References

External links
The chinese Tornado Kick - aka Whirlwindkick 360, 540 and 720
Wushuwiki Xuanfengjiao

Kicks
Martial art techniques
Wushu (sport)